"Dawn (Go Away)" is a song written by Bob Gaudio and Sandy Linzer and recorded by The Four Seasons in November 1963.  
The song hit No. 3 in the early part of 1964. According to Billboard, it was the 25th biggest hit single of the year, placing behind "Rag Doll", another Four Seasons hit, which was No. 24.

Background
It was recorded as the Four Seasons were involved in a royalty dispute with Vee-Jay Records. As the lawsuit proceeded, the group recorded "Dawn" and a handful of other songs and withheld the master tapes from Vee-Jay, which then claimed breach of contract. The dispute was not settled until 1965, a year after the Four Seasons officially left Vee-Jay.

The group signed with Philips Records, a subsidiary of Mercury Records, shortly thereafter. "Dawn (Go Away)" was released in January 1964. It took four weeks to climb the Billboard Hot 100 chart to number 3 on February 29, 1964, prevented from going higher by The Beatles' "I Want to Hold Your Hand" and "She Loves You", which became the top two singles of 1964. "Dawn" remained at number 3 for three weeks, then dropped to make way for two further Beatles singles ("Twist and Shout" and "Please Please Me"). During its six-week run in the Top Ten, only Beatles hits ranked above it in the chart.

Cash Box said that the song "is delivered with that stompin', falsetto-highlighted money-making touch of the Four Seasons" and praised the arrangement and conducting by Charles Calello.

Originally written as a folk song, arranger Charles Calello sped it up and, at Valli's suggestion, added a galloping rhythm guitar borrowed from Kai Winding's version of "More". Drummer Buddy Saltzman accented the recording with bombastic around-the-kit fills and ghost notes without using any cymbals.

The single version, with a two-line sung introduction, was never recorded in true stereo. Early "stereo" album releases were rechanneled (with the high and low frequencies on one channel and the midrange on the other); later stereo issues, from the Edizione d'Oro greatest hits album onward, include different takes of the recording. One begins with a short drum intro, featuring a louder and more frantic drum backing by Saltzman, and slightly different vocals. Both versions are listed as 2 minutes 11 seconds long, but the stereo "Dawn" is 2 minutes 30 seconds, and the mono version with the "Pretty as midsummer's morn. They called her Dawn" intro is 2 minutes 45 seconds.

"Dawn (Go Away)" was the only Philips single crediting the Four Seasons that did not have the notation "featuring the 'sound' of Frankie Valli".

References 

Songs written by Bob Gaudio
The Four Seasons (band) songs
1964 singles
Songs written by Sandy Linzer
Song recordings produced by Bob Crewe
1964 songs
Philips Records singles